Code monkey may refer to:
 A computer programmer who is not involved in any aspect of conceptual or design work, but simply writes code to specifications given
 Code Monkeys, an animated television series 
 "Code Monkey" (song), by Jonathan Coulton
 CodeMonkey (software), an educational computer environment

See also 
 Cowboy coder